The 2015 Duke Blue Devils football team represented Duke University in the 2015 NCAA Division I FBS football season as a member of the Atlantic Coast Conference (ACC) in the Coastal Division. The team was led by head coach David Cutcliffe, in his eighth year, and played its home games at the newly renovated Wallace Wade Stadium in Durham, North Carolina. They finished the season 8–5 overall and 4–4 in ACC play to tie for fourth place in the Coastal Division. They were invited to the Pinstripe Bowl, where they defeated Indiana, 44–41, in overtime.

Schedule

Personnel

Roster

Coaching staff

Game summaries

at Tulane

North Carolina Central

No. 23 Northwestern

No. 20 Georgia Tech

Boston College

at Army

at Virginia Tech

Miami (FL)

at No. 21 North Carolina

Pittsburgh

at Virginia

at Wake Forest

vs. Indiana (Pinstripe Bowl)

Rankings

References

Duke
Duke Blue Devils football seasons
Pinstripe Bowl champion seasons
Duke Blue Devils football